Mahim (Marathi pronunciation: [maːɦiːm])(Marathi: माहिम) is a neighbourhood in Mumbai, Maharashtra, India. The Mahim Junction railway station on the Western Railway and Harbour Railway of the Mumbai Suburban Railway network is the last station of the city, as neighboring Bandra comes in Mumbai Suburb. Mahim is an ethnically and religiously diverse town and has a Hindu temple, church, mosque and Parsi fire-temple existing within a few meters of each other. The town has a large Rich and Upper Middle class Marathi population.

History 

The name Mahim is derived from the ancient Mahikavati meaning "miraculous" in Sanskrit. Other historical names for the area include Mahimawati, Maijim, and Mejambu.

Mahim was one of the seven islands that originally made up Mumbai. Mahim, or Mahikavati as it was known, was the capital of Raja Bhimdev, who reigned over the region in the 13th century. He built a palace and a court of justice in Prabhadevi, as well as the first Babulnath temple.

In 1343, this island was possessed by the Delhi Sultanate. It was in their reign that the old Mahim mosque was built. A dargah of Makhdoom Ali Mahimi was built here in 1431.

In 1543, the Portuguese captured the islands of Mumbai. In 1662, these islands were given to the English King, King Charles II, as a part of the wedding dowry for the Portuguese princess, Catherine of Braganza. After the British acquired Mumbai, they built the Mahim Fort here to protect themselves from the Marathas.

The causeway connecting Mahim and Bandra (corrupted from "Bunder" meaning port in Persian) was completed in 1845 at a cost of Rs. 1,57,000 donated entirely by Lady Avabai Jamsetjee Jeejeebhoy, wife of the first baronet Sir Jamsetjee Jeejebhoy with a stipulation that no toll would be charged to citizens for its use by the government.

In 1847, a small group of Scottish missionaries decided to start a new school, now one of the most high-profile schools in Mumbai — the Bombay Scottish School.

The 1993 Bombay bombings took place in Mahim among other places. A truck driver placed a vehicle here and put a bomb there which exploded.

The town is also in close proximity to the remarkable Maharashtra Nature Park. This park has been created out of a garbage dump, and houses a bird sanctuary. It houses 12,500 varieties of plants and several rare birds including flamingos.

Demographics -

The town has a large and strong base of upper middle class and rich Maharashtrian people. The largest ethnic minority group being Goans (Konkani speaking) followed by the South Indian (mostly Kannadigas and Tamilians) and a few Gujaratis. Hinduism is the most followed religion while Christianity and Islam are the second and third most followed religions respectively. There is also a small community of Parsis (Zorastrians), Buddhists and Jains residing in Mahim.

Geography 

Mahim is surrounded by the Arabian Sea to the west, Bandra to the North, Matunga and Dadar to South and by Dharavi and Sion to the east.

Schools and educational institutions 
Mahim has a number of schools and educational institutions. Some of the well-known schools are Bombay Scottish School, Mahim, Canossa Convent High School, k.J Khilnani High School, Victoria High School, Saraswati Mandir High School, Lokmanya Vidyamandir, Billa Bong school and St Michael High School). Reputed colleges and professional educational institutes such as P.D. Hinduja National Hospital and Medical Research Centre, D. G. Ruparel College of Arts, Science and Commerce, St. Xavier's Technical Institute and Xavier Institute of Engineering also in Mahim.

Mahim Bay 
Mahim Bay is a large bay, part of the Arabian Sea in Mumbai, Maharashtra, India. The southern end is Worli, the northern end is Bandra Reclamation and Mahim is in the centre. The bay was named after the islands of Mahim and Salsette were merged in the early 19th century. The Mithi River drains into Mahim Creek.

During the colonial era, the Portuguese built a watchtower called Castella de Aguada on the northern side. Later, the British built the Worli Fort to the south and Mahim Fort near the creek to defend the seven islands of Bombay against attacks by the Portuguese and the Marathas. The Bandra-Worli Sealink crosses Mahim Bay.

Mahimchi Khadi (Mahim Creek) 

The Mithi River drains into the creek which drains into the Mahim Bay. It forms the boundary between the city (Churchgate to Mahim)and suburbs (Bandra to Dahisar) of Mumbai. The creek is swamped by mangroves and has a mini-ecosystem.

It now has the Bandra-Kurla complex with corporate offices on both its sides.

The waters of the creek are foul smelling due to the dumping of untreated industrial effluents upstream. In recent years, the mushrooming of slums around the waters has caused concern for the mangrove ecosystem, vital to the ecosystem of Mumbai.

In 2006, it was the site of mass hysteria as thousands claimed its waters had turned "sweet."

Transportation

The nearest railway station is Mahim Junction on the Western line and Harbour Line of the Mumbai Suburban Railway network. The station is an important Junction as it connects Western Suburbs (till Goregaon) with Harbour line (CSMT to Kings Circle). Taxis and buses are widely used by the locals and auto rickshaws are not allowed. The Chhatrapati Shivaji Maharaj International Airport is just 4 kilometers away from the town.

Mahim Causeway 

The Mahim Causeway is a vital link road connecting the neighborhoods of Mahim in Mumbai City district to Bandra in Mumbai Suburban district.

The Mahim Causeway was built between 1841 and 1846 to connect the island of Salsette with Mahim. The swampy area between the two islands made travel dangerous and thus a need for a causeway arose. The British East India Company, which governed Bombay at that time, refused to fund the project. This led Lady Jeejeebhoy, wife of the first baronet Sir Jamsetjee Jeejeebhoy, to donate the entire amount of 157,000/-  on the condition that the government would not charge a toll for its use or disturb the Koli community who lived around the area.

The Mahim Causeway forms the link between Swami Vivekanand Road and L.J. Road, being the stretch between Bandra Masjid and Mahim church (St.Michael's Church). It is not to be confused with the Bandra-Worli Sea Link, a major infrastructural project opened on 30 June 2009 which is designed to ease traffic across the causeway by building another bridge across the Mahim Bay.

Mahim Fort 

Mahim Fort, which was once visible from the Mahim Causeway and Bandra Reclamation, is barely visible now. The Mahim Fort along with Fort St George in South Mumbai was an important base during the time of the British Empire. Other forts in Mumbai and Salsette Island include Sion, Worli, Sewri and Mazgaon. Fort St George was built in 1669, by the former Governor of Bombay, Gerald Aungier.

Thomas Grantham then strengthened the fort's ramparts in 1684. In 1772, 111 years after Bombay was taken from them, the Portuguese attempted to attack this fort. The British replied fiercely with cannonballs. The Bandra church also bore the brunt of their fire. There were about 100 soldiers and 30 cannons in the Mahim Fort at that time.

The fort is situated just beside Mahim beach. Today the fort is almost ruined and encroachers and hutments occupy it.

See also 

 Makhdoom Ali Mahimi
 St. Michael's Church (Mumbai)
 Mithi River
 Back Bay
 Mahim Causeway
 Mahim halwa

References 

Neighbourhoods in Mumbai
Mumbai City district
Islands of India
Populated places in India